The Ward's red-backed vole (Eothenomys wardi) is a species of rodent in the family Cricetidae. It is found in China, specifically the north-western area of Yunnan Province. It is sometimes considered a subspecies of Eothenomys chinensis, but most zoologists consider it to be a separate species due to the noticeably shorter tail and hind feet.

References

Musser, G. G. and M. D. Carleton. 2005. Superfamily Muroidea. pp. 894–1531 in Mammal Species of the World a Taxonomic and Geographic Reference. D. E. Wilson and D. M. Reeder eds. Johns Hopkins University Press, Baltimore.

Eothenomys
Mammals described in 1912
Taxa named by Oldfield Thomas